The 2011 Asian Cycling Championships took place at a velodrome within the King’s 80th Birthday Sports Complex,  Nakhon Ratchasima, Thailand from 9 to 19 February 2011.

Medal summary

Road

Men

Women

Track

Men

Women

Medal table

References
 Medal List of Road Race by Event
 Medallists by Event

External links
 Race Schedule Asian Cycling Championships 2011
 Official website

Asia
Asia
Cycling
Asian Cycling Championships
Cycling in Thailand
2011 in Asian sport
International cycle races hosted by Thailand